Jerangau–Jabor Highway, Federal Route 14 (Malay: Lebuhraya Jerangau–Jabor) is a 179.63-km federal highway running from the city of Kuala Terengganu, Terengganu, Malaysia to Kuantan, Pahang. The highway runs in parallel with the Federal Route 3 - while the FT3 highway is a coastal highway, the Jerangau–Jabor Highway FT14 runs through the interior area instead. Although the distance from Kuala Terengganu to Kuantan via both FT3 and FT14 highways are about the same (about 200 km), the Jerangau–Jabor Highway FT14 significantly shortens the travelling time due to fewer towns being passed. Therefore, the Jerangau–Jabor Highway FT14 became the main route from Pahang to Terengganu before the advent of the East Coast Expressway Phase 2 E8.

Route background and features
The Jerangau–Jabor Highway FT14 is the interior counterpart of the Terengganuan section of the Federal Route 3, with its Kilometre Zero located at its interchange with the Kuantan Bypass FT3. The distance between Kuantan and Kuala Terengganu via the FT14 and FT3 highways are almost the same (200 km), but the journey via the FT14 highway is faster due to fewer towns along the way. There are three major rest areas (RSA) along the Jerangau–Jabor Highway FT14, namely the Bandar Cheneh Baharu RSA, Bandar Al-Muktafi Billah Shah R//R and Bukit Besi RSA.

History

The Jerangau–Jabor Highway project was announced in 1973 by the second Prime Minister, Tun Abdul Razak during the launch of the Central Terengganu Development Authority (Malay: Lembaga Kemajuan Terengganu Tengah (KETENGAH)). The highway was constructed as a means to speed up the development of the poorly-developed areas in the interior of Terengganu, just like the role of the Tun Razak Highway FT12 towards Pahang. Before the advent of the Jerangau–Jabor Highway FT14, the Federal Route 3 was the only major federal highway running within Terengganu. The construction of the FT14 highway had spawned many federal and state highways that link between the FT14 and FT3 highways. Two roads formed the pioneer route of the Federal Route 14, namely the Kuala Terengganu-Kuala Berang Road FT14/FT106 and the Ajil-Dungun Road FT14/FT132. Construction of highway began in 1977 and was completed in 1979.

The Jerangau–Jabor Highway FT14 is notorious for its recurring premature surface failures ever since the highway was under construction. Many sections along the highway are plagued with potholes, posing accident risks to road users. Overladen lorries are blamed for the road surface deterioration, as many of them do not obey the maximum axle weight limit of 9 tonnes. Lack of enforcement worsens the situation, evidenced by only one Road Transport Department enforcement station along the highway. On the other hand, the shorter Tun Razak Highway FT12 has two enforcement stations.

Since the Jerangau–Jabor Highway FT14 was opened to traffic in 1979, it served as the main backbone route from Pahang to Terengganu. However, after the East Coast Expressway Phase 2 E8 was opened, the daily traffic of the Jerangau–Jabor Highway FT14 had dropped by 80%. As a result, many towns along the FT14 highway that rely on passers-by as their main income source such as Ajil are now facing the threat of declining businesses by up to 40%.

List of junctions and towns (south-north)

See also
 Malaysia Federal Route 3 - the coastal counterpart of the Jerangau–Jabor Highway FT14

References

Highways in Malaysia
014